Ursel Bangert is the Bernal Chair in Microscopy and Imaging at the University of Limerick. She develops advanced characterisation techniques such as transmission electron microscopy for the atomic scale imaging of novel materials.

Early life and education 
During her undergraduate studies Bangert was a high school teacher in Köln-Deutz. She completed both her undergraduate and postgraduate studies at the University of Cologne. Her doctoral research considers the thermoluminescence of natural and synthetic calcite.

Research and career 
After completing her doctorate, Bangert joined the faculty at the University of Cologne. She moved to the University of Surrey as a research fellow in the Department of Electrical Engineering. She was eventually made an Advanced Science and Engineering Research Council (SERC) Fellow and lecturer at the University of Surrey. In 1993 she joined University of Manchester Institute of Science and Technology as a lecturer in pure and applied physics. She was eventually appointed to the faculty at the University of Manchester, where she explored novel electron microscopies with ultrahigh spatial resolution. Bangert was responsible for the electron-optical facilities at Manchester, Liverpool and Daresbury Laboratory.

In particular, Bangert pioneered the use of electron energy loss spectroscopy to better understand the electronic structure of wide-bandgap semiconductors, diamond and carbon nanotubes. Whilst at Manchester, Bangert studied the two-dimensional material graphene. She was the first to use high-angle annular dark-field imaging (HAADF) to understand the atomic structure of graphene.

In 2014 Bangert was appointed the Bernal Chair in Microscopy and Imaging at the University of Limerick. At the University of Limerick, Bangert established an International Centre for Ultra-High Resolution Imaging and Characterisation. She raised funding to purchase a Thermo Fisher Scientific Titan Themis, which allows the imaging and spectroscopic characterisation of novel materials at the atomic scale.

Select publications

References 

Living people
Year of birth missing (living people)
Academics of the University of Limerick
University of Cologne alumni
Women physicists